York High School is a mixed secondary school in York, North Yorkshire, England. It has a comprehensive admissions policy, and in 2016 had an enrolment of 757 pupils ages 11–16.

History
York High School was established through the 2007 merger of Oaklands School and Lowfield School. The new school initially operated on the site of Lowfield School, expanded with temporary buildings, while a new school was constructed on the site of Oaklands School.

The name of the school was chosen after a vote by pupils at the schools and the local community.

York High School has achieved positive Ofsted reports, and currently has a 'good' rating.

Between 5–6 a.m. on the morning of Friday 3 October 2008, a third of the school buildings on the Dijon Avenue site were burnt down in a fire. Students were given the day off and local residents were advised to stay away from the site.  Students were given a week off school while staff and local authority officials put into place alternative educational arrangements for the pupils, and during this week many sporting and community activities were laid on. The school's headteacher subsequently credited the fire as the turning point in the school's journey towards greater success.

Subsequently, the Dijon Avenue site was closed and all pupils are in the newly built school. In April 2009 construction of its new buildings was completed, and the school relocated to Cornlands Road on the former site of Oaklands School.

Previously a community school administered by York City Council, in May 2018 York High School converted to academy status. The school is now sponsored by the South Bank Multi Academy Trust.

References

External links
 York High School web site

Educational institutions established in 2007
Secondary schools in York
Academies in York
2007 establishments in England